Songs and Tunes from The Original Soundtrack of Magical Sentosa (often shortened to Magical Sentosa: The Original Soundtrack or Magical Sentosa soundtrack) is a remix album of the multimedia ECA2 show, "Le Lac Aux Images"; though it actually serves as the main soundtrack to other ECA2 production, "Magical Sentosa". It is currently not known when it was recorded; many have suggested the soundtrack was probably recorded around 2001 in the studios of ECA2 located in France. Originally, most tracks have never been able to be released to the general public except "Water Waltz", which was somehow bootlegged onto YouTube in its original studio audio in mid-2011. The soundtrack album is considered a collectable because of its rarity and historical significance. The album employs early material directly stripped off  Le Lac Aux Images and later remixed to its current form. The soundtrack has largely survived in home video format; some of them were bootlegged by audiences who have watched the show itself. It was until the 30 January 2013, when a Singaporean YouTuber who goes by the username "caix92" rediscovered the album among a stash of items at his / her home. All eight tracks in their original studio audio were uploaded to the owner's YouTube page along with the album's artwork, thought to be long lost in its entirety for six years after the fountain's closure.

Background
During the project emphasis of the ECA2 production, Le Lac Aux Images. Philippe Villar and Pascal Lengagne composed and produced music pieces to the latter's soundtrack providing some music to be recycled for the latter's replacement, Magical Sentosa in 2001 or 2002. During the recording of the soundtrack for Magical Sentosa, the duo both returned to remix and edit tracks from Le Lac Aux Images and add in additional tracks from the new studio tapes. Resulting in some changes to the original audio tracks from the Le Lac Aux Images soundtrack. Villar and Lengagne both mentioned that they wanted the soundtrack to be a fusion of the eastern and western musical genres, to create a more appealing piece that is understandable to different people. In early 2007, plans were announced for the demolition of the show's venue, the Sentosa Musical Fountain, to commence on 26 March 2007. This resulted many to do home video recordings of the last show on the 25 March 2007. Some of these recordings were professionally edited and released as bootlegs, majority of these videos ended up on the video-sharing site, YouTube. There was no original audio from the album that existed in its entire originality until the audio uploads from "caix92" in late January 2013.

January 2013 Rediscovery
On the 30 January 2013, a Singaporean YouTuber who goes by the eponymous username "caix92" rediscovered the album in its original entirety. In a comment he / she mentioned that the album was originally bought by him / her shortly before the show ceased operations on 26 March 2007. It was probably stashed along other items and forgotten for years until its recent discovery by the owner. The rediscovery of the album also revealed the names of entirely new and unknown cast members involved in the making of the soundtrack. Examples included, Adele Masquelier, who did the soprano voices for Hello Hello and the Princess Pearl song and Jerome Scemla, who wrote the screenplay for Magical Sentosa. The album's artwork which was thought to be lost for six years was also shown in all of the video thumbnails. It shows Kiki "standing" on the fountain's main pool proudly gazing at the night sky full of stars, with the Merlion statue and a member of the mock band, The Fantastic Fish watching on. If one looks at the album cover carefully, he or she can also see the Orion constellation partially blocked by the Merlion's head to the top left of the album cover. One would also notice the plaster SENTOSA sculpture at the bottom of the album cover.

November 2020 Rediscovery
The upload by Caix92 disappeared from YouTube for three years, and only Water Waltz survived on the site. Then, in November 2020, a user by the name of Werdna FPV re-uploaded the soundtrack in its entirety to YouTube.

Track listing

Notes
 The track Here Everybody Lives in Harmony is a medley consisting of three verses, Verse 1: Here Everybody Lives in Harmony, Verse 2: The Gamelan Ensemble and Verse 3: Here Everybody Lives in Harmony (Reprise).

Scores

Here Everybody Lives in Harmony (Minus one)
The score is not officially part of the original soundtrack though it is used as entrance music to the show.

Water Waltz
Incorporating a choir, a harp and a xylophone. The score was later bootlegged and somehow leaked onto YouTube in 2011. Other than the bootleg recording, ECA2 has never released the official version for distribution other than the album version from "caix92".

Circus
The score is notable as it is famous for incorporating Kiki's trademark laughter. In the album, the track's opening has a much more stronger treble beat as for the show, the treble is reduced. Also the album's version has a louder bass drum while the show uses the more sharper drum kit (this though is still restored in the opening and bridges of the album's version of the track).

Princess Pearl Song
It is the only score to include a solo singer. Though siren singing is used, the score is more focused to the rhythm of the guzheng, which could be heard playing predominantly in the background. The song which was sung by soprano singer Adele Masquelier; whom is believed by many that she herself played the role of Princess Pearl, but since ECA2 has never released the names of the original cast members for Magical Sentosa until this day, this is often disputed. The song is remarkably recognized by some due to the fact that the singer, Princess Pearl, was one of several plot characters recycled from ECA2's earlier production, Le Lac Aux Images, in France. In Le Lac Aux Images, although the melody was vastly different, her dance moves and siren song were recycled for the Magical Sentosa show in 2002 with some minor changes, before it was shut down a year later. Also, should one listen carefully to Fischer Media's fragment of the show, as Kiki floats on a bubble, the song right until the siren song could be heard playing in the background.

Here Everybody Lives in Harmony
This climatic medley is the most distinguishable music piece from the show. It is noted as the most popular track on the album, due to the fact that this is the show's theme. All titles listed in the medley are not found in the soundtrack's listing but are instead compiled in to this two-minute-long track.

 Verse 1: Here Everybody Lives in Harmony
The medley starts off with the theme song to Magical Sentosa, Here Everybody Lives in Harmony. The baroque pop song uses vocals from the show's protagonist, Kiki. It is played against the sounds of a French military band ensemble (excluding the xylophone). The reprise version of this song also implements the same instruments. On the album, the song starts with a bass riff but on the show, it starts directly with the vocals.

 Verse 2: The Gamelan Ensemble
It later moves on to an ambient piece, consisting of only a single musical ensemble, namely the gamelan. The introductory music piece then segues into the next tune, the reprise of Here Everybody Lives in Harmony.

 Verse 3: Here Everybody Lives in Harmony (Reprise)
After the second verse, the Gamelan ensemble switches to a more complex French military band styled verse. This piece is actually the climax to the medley itself. The composition compromises of commonly used French military band instruments. Examples include the tuba, trumpet, bass drum and cymbals. The piece was originally found on an earlier version of ECA2's teaser commercial.

Grand Finale
Grand Finale brings both the show and the album to a climatic close. It implements eastern and western classical instruments mainly from the string family. Instruments include the Erhu, a single flute, violas, bass drums, triangles and cymbals. After the show was shut down, it was believed that ECA2 recycled this audio track for the finale of the replacement show, Songs of the Sea.

Songs

Hello Hello!
The rhapsody introduces Kiki's friends to fountain master Mr Whamsey and the audience. It is best known for its signature ending sung by the in-show band The Fantastic Fish. The piece is supposedly inspired by Queen's Bohemian Rhapsody due to the fact that the song changes music genres in every verse.

It's My World
It's My World is characterized by strong bass and hip hop beats. Sung by Kiki, it expresses his feelings throughout the lyrics. Heavy sampling of scratching is used at the song bridges. The song samples the stomp-stomp-clap rhythm of the hit song "We Will Rock You" by Queen replacing the stomps with two hyperbeats and the clap with either a backbeat or a stomp at its chorus but with a more speedy rhythm. In the album, the song starts off with a flute melody, but starts with vocals directly on the show. The track later segues into "The Fire Ballet".

Originally, the song had a lot of problems with lyric distinguishability. The most significant one, was the opening line. Many had problems deciphering it in standard audio quality. 
The bridges of the song itself also have deciphering difficulties as well as the song's ending.

The Mermaids Song
The ostinato lyrical song is a simple tune set to gamelan music along with a single playing flute and synthesized beats. The song has appears to have received influence from ambient and trance music.

Personnel
These are the possible crew members of the soundtrack. Kiki's name also appears on the personnel list as a red herring, they are as follows.

Philippe Villar and Pascal Lengagne - composition; conductors; acoustic?; bass?

Jerome Scemla - Composition; Vocals?

Adele Masquelier - Vocals; Soprano

Yves Pepin - Supervision

See also
 Sentosa Island
 Sentosa Musical Fountain
 Magical Sentosa
 Songs of the Sea
 Fountain of Wealth
 Songs of the Sea Soundtrack
 Kiki the Hyperactive Monkey of Sentosa

References

External links
 Magical Sentosa Trailer
 The Official Video of Songs of the Sea Part 1 on YouTube
 The Official Video of Songs of the Sea Part 2 on YouTube
 The Official Video of Songs of the Sea Part 3 on YouTube
 The Official Video of Magical Sentosa Part 1
 The Official Video of Magical Sentosa Part 2
 The Official Video of Magical Sentosa Part 3
 Laservision™ projects on Spirits of Sentosa.

2002 soundtrack albums